Antologija 1983–1998 II (trans. Anthology 1982–1998 II) is the second compilation album by Serbian and Yugoslav hard rock band Kerber, released in 1998. It was the second of two compilation albums the band released in 1998, the first one being Antologija 1983–1998 I. The album features ballads and acoustic songs from the band's studio albums released during the 1983-1996 period.

Track listing

Credits
Goran Šepa - vocals
Tomislav Nikolić - guitar
Branislav Božinović - keyboard
Zoran Žikić - bass guitar
Zoran Stamenković - drums
Dragoljub Đuričić - drums
Branko Isaković - bass guitar
Saša Vasković - bass guitar
Josip Hartl - drums
Vladan Stanojević - acoustic guitar
Goran Đorđević - percussion

References 
Antologija 1983–1998 II at Discogs

External links
Antologija 1983–1998 II at Discogs

Kerber compilation albums
1998 compilation albums